Ben-Zion "Bentzi" Gophstein (born 10 September 1969) is a political activist affiliated with the radical right in Israel, a student of Meir Kahane, and founder and director of Lehava, an Israeli Jewish anti-assimilation organization. He was a member of the Council of Kiryat Arba, 2010-2013. In November 2019, he was indicted on charges of incitement to terrorism, violence, and racism.

Kahanism
Gopstein is a student of Meir Kahane and an adherent of Kahanism, the ideology named for and developed by him and promoted by his banned Kach party in Israel. Kach incited to racism and advocated the expulsion of Arabs from Israel and the Palestinian Territories, and Gopstein praised the 1994 Cave of the Patriarchs massacre committed by fellow Kach member Baruch Goldstein. He has participated in memorials to Kahane.

Shortly after Kahane's 1990 assassination, Gopstein was arrested, and then released, in a case involving the unsolved murder of an Arab couple. In 1994, Gopstein was assigned to administrative detention as a result of his involvement with Kahane's then-banned organization.

In 2015, in a tape-recorded talk, Gopstein justified burning down churches based on the religious teachings against idolatry by 12th-century Jewish philosopher and scholar Maimonides. Later that year, he advocated expelling Christians from Israel and banning celebration of Christmas there.

Hemla
Gopstein has served as public relations director of Hemla, a publicly funded non-profit. For many years, Hemla focused on "saving the daughters of Israel" from mixed marriages with Arab men, and received up to $175,000 each year from the state between 2005 and 2013. Part of the public funding went to Gopstein's salary. While some considered Hemla to be focused on keeping Jewish women from dating Arab men, Gopstein described the charter of the Hemla in an interview with Haaretz:

Lehava
Gopstein serves as head of Lehava, an anti-assimilation organization. It is dedicated to preventing personal, romantic, or business relationships between Jews and non-Jews, particularly Arabs. Lehava's activities are documented in a recent report titled "Racism and Gender in Israel" by the Israel Religious Action Center and other groups active against racism. In 2011, Lehava plastered posters in ultra-Orthodox neighborhoods of Jerusalem deploring a supermarket chain that employed Palestinians. The slogan of the fliers was, "Do you want your grandson to be called Ahmad Ben Sarah?" The group began distributing "kosher certificates" to businesses that did not employ Arabs to encourage discrimination against non-Jews. In 2012, Lehava distributed fliers warning Palestinian men not to date Jewish women. In addition to opposing interfaith and interethnic marriages, and promoting discrimination against Palestinians and Arabs in employment, Lehava also has encouraged Israelis to report to the organization the names of Jews who rent to Palestinians so that they can be named and publicly shamed.

A group of anti-racist organizations petitioned Israel's Supreme Court against the state attorney, Lehava, and Gopstein. According to the petition, Gopstein had, in addition to promoting discrimination against Palestinians and other Arabs, praised a group of Jewish youths who attacked Palestinians in Jerusalem, leaving one victim unconscious and hospitalized. The court case is pending.

In 2014, three members of Lehava were arrested, and indicted in 2014 for committing arson and spray-painting anti-Arab graffiti at the Max Rayne Hand in Hand: Center for Jewish Arab Education in Israel (Yad B'Yad) Bilingual School in Jerusalem. Gopstein, along with several other group members, was arrested shortly thereafter for incitement. In the same year, Gopstein openly criticized Yair Netanyahu, son of then-prime minister, Benjamin Netanyahu, for dating a non-Jewish women of Nordic descent.  

In January 2015, Channel 2 reported that Defense Minister Moshe Ya'alon may be preparing to categorize Lehava as a terrorist organization. Ya'alon was reported to have ordered the Shin Bet and the Defense Ministry to assemble evidence required for the classification. The arson incident received international attention. Gopstein issued a statement harshly critical of Ya'alon:

A journalist participated in Lehava undercover and reported on Gopstein's leadership. Liat Bar-Stav described a meeting that Gopstein led for his followers, in which he said to them:

As the crowd responded with booing and cheering, Gopstein continued:

Before his Facebook account was permanently disabled, it had doctored images of Arab Israeli Knesset members who appear to be hanged by the neck.

Anti-LGBT activity
In the past, the organization sought to disrupt and protest the Jerusalem Pride Parade, in order to fight what Gopstein called "LGBT terrorism", stating that the LGBT and alternative community "are bringing disaster to Israel".

Advocacy outside Israel
Gopstein wrote a letter to Facebook founder and CEO Mark Zuckerberg protesting both Zuckerberg's marriage to a non-Jewish woman, as well as the Palestinian use of Facebook. He complained, "In Israel, too, assimilation is hitting us quite a bit because of your Facebook, where every Mohammed is 'CitySlicker', and every Yusuf calls himself 'Prince Charming'".

In 2018, Gopstein started a fund-raiser to raise money to sue Facebook for censorship.

Attitude towards Christians

Gopstein has called for the incineration of Christian churches. The discussion centered on whether Maimonides's ruling to eliminate idol worship was valid also for modern times.
On the Haredi website Kooker, Gopstein published an article in December 2015 calling for the suppression of Christmas celebrations in Israel and the expulsion of Christians, whom he likened to vampires. Calling the Christian Church "the deadly enemy of the Jewish people for centuries", he wrote, "Their missionaries prowl for prey in Jerusalem." In response, Israeli groups have asked he be investigated for incitement.

Reactions
In 2016, the Anti-Defamation League (ADL) sent a letter to the Israeli government, encouraging action to be taken to curb Gopstein. In the letter to Attorney General Avichai Mendelblit, the ADL said that Gopstein has referred to Christians as "bloodsucking vampires", condoned burning Christian churches, and that his Facebook page includes anti-LGBT posts, as well as ones the ADL calls "extremely abusive, racist, inflammatory, and violent".

The Reform Center for Religion and Policy petitioned Mandelblit again in 2018. During a hearing, however, the petition was withdrawn by suggestion of multiple Supreme Court justices.

Election bans
In the run-up to the September 2019 Knesset election, Gopstein boycotted a hearing of the High Court of Justice on whether Otzma Yehudit should be allowed on the ballot. He claimed that "the judges already made their decision" and would overturn the Law of Return if given the chance.

Indictment
In late November 2019, nine years after an initial complaint had been filed by the Israeli Reform movement regarding his behavior, Gopstein was indicted for incitement to violence, racism, and support for terrorism on the basis of a series of statements he made over a five-year period from 2012 to 2017, such as praising the mass murderer Baruch Goldstein, defending the actions of youths involved in the Zion Square assault, calling Palestinians a cancer, and stating that there was no shortage of Arabs who deserved to be beaten up. The indictment was approved by the Israeli Attorney General. Gopstein responded by declaring he would persist in campaigning against Jewish-Arab co-existence, and asserted that the indictment was tantamount to state-sponsored persecution.

Personal life
Gopstein is married to Anat Gopstein, and has eight children.

References

1969 births
Living people
Anti-Arabism in Israel
Israeli Kahanists
Israeli settlers
Kiryat Arba
Opposition to Christianity in Israel
Otzma Yehudit politicians
People from Bnei Brak